Grigory Mikhaylovich Zhilkin (born 20 June 2003) is a Russian football player who plays for FC Krasnodar and FC Krasnodar-2.

Club career
He made his Russian Football National League debut for FC Krasnodar-2 on 12 March 2022 against FC Fakel Voronezh.

He made his debut in the Russian Premier League for FC Krasnodar on 21 May 2022 in a game against FC Akhmat Grozny.

Career statistics

References

External links
 
 
 

2003 births
People from Oryol Oblast
Sportspeople from Oryol Oblast
Living people
Russian footballers
Russia youth international footballers
Association football defenders
FC Krasnodar-2 players
FC Krasnodar players
Russian First League players
Russian Premier League players